Thomas Harrison House is a historic home located at Harrisonburg, Virginia. USA. It was built in 1750 and is a 1½-story, two bay by one bay, coursed limestone vernacular dwelling. It has a gable roof and was built over a spring, which is accessible in the basement. It is the oldest house in Harrisonburg and its builder is regarded as the town's founder.

It was listed on the National Register of Historic Places in 1973.

References

Houses on the National Register of Historic Places in Virginia
Houses completed in 1750
Houses in Harrisonburg, Virginia
National Register of Historic Places in Harrisonburg, Virginia
1750 establishments in the Thirteen Colonies